Allen State Forest is a  state forest of New Hampshire located in the northwest section of the city of Concord in Merrimack County.

References

New Hampshire state forests
Parks in Merrimack County, New Hampshire
Concord, New Hampshire